Hisham is an Arabic male given name which means "generous". It is not to be confused with the similar looking, but only slightly related, Hashim.

People

Given name
Hisham ibn Abd al-Malik (691–743), Umayyad caliph (r. 724–743)
Hisham ibn al-A'as (died 635), Arab companion of Muhammad
Hisham I of Córdoba (757–796), ruler of Cordoba, Al-Andalus
Hisham II (966–1013), ruler of Cordoba, Al-Andalus
Hisham III of Córdoba (died 1036), ruler of Cordoba, Al-Andalus
Hisham Abbas (born 1963), Egyptian singer
Hisham Barakat (1950–2015), Egyptian prosecutor
Hisham Hafiz (1931–2006), Saudi Arabian newspaper publisher
Hisham Jaber (born 1942), Lebanese general
Hisham Nazer (1932–2015), Saudi Arabian politician 
Hisham Al Shaar (born 1958), Syrian politician
Hisham Sulliman (born 1978), Arab-Israeli actor
Hisham ibn Urwah (667–772), Muslim scholar
Hisham Zreiq (born 1968), Palestinian filmmaker and visual artist

Surname and family name
Ibn Hisham (died 833), Muslim historian
Maslama ibn Hisham
Mu'awiya ibn Hisham
Sulayman ibn Hisham
Yazid al-Afqam, also known as Yazid ibn Hisham

See also
Hesham
Hicham
Hisham ud-Din (disambiguation)
Arabic name

References

Arabic masculine given names